My Style is a fashion and self-help book written by the Australian entertainer Dannii Minogue, released in September 2011.

In this book, Minogue shares her fashion wisdom and personal style secrets, backed up by an all-new photoshoot. Dannii talks about loving you the way you are, focusing on ways to accentuate the positive, and covers everything from great hair and glowing skin to make-up and embracing a healthy exercise regime. She also shares her tips on red carpet looks and what to wear for every occasion, and offers advice on dressing for your shape and choosing the right accessories. My Style is an inspirational guide to making the most of what you've got and looking your best.

A special enhanced edition of the digital eBook was released on iTunes featuring the book and two behind-the-scenes videos.

References

External links
 My Style -  Simon & Schuster's website.

2011 non-fiction books
Australian autobiographies
Dannii Minogue